"Positions" is a song recorded by American singer Ariana Grande. The song was released by Republic Records on October 23, 2020, as the lead single from Grande's sixth studio album of the same name. The song was written by Grande, Angelina Barrett, Brian Vincent Bates, Nija Charles, James Jarvis, Tommy Brown, London on da Track, and Mr. Franks, and produced by the last three.

"Positions" is a midtempo song blending pop and R&B over trap beats, plucked guitar, and violin. Its lyrics see Grande extend romantic overtures to her love interest. The song was met with generally positive reviews from music critics, who embraced its breezy and mellow sound. The song's music video, directed by Dave Meyers, accompanied the song's release, and depicts Grande as the President of the United States. A live performance music video of "Positions" was released on July 22, 2021. It received a nomination for Best Pop Solo Performance at the 64th Annual Grammy Awards.

"Positions" debuted atop the US Billboard Hot 100, becoming Grande's fifth US number-one single and her third consecutive number-one debut of 2020, following "Stuck with U" and "Rain on Me". It extended her records as the first artist to have five number-one debut singles on the chart and for having all the lead singles of each of her albums debut within the top-10 of the chart. It also debuted at number one on the Billboard Global 200 and Billboard Global Excl. U.S., making "Positions" the first song to simultaneously debut atop both charts and the Hot 100. Elsewhere, the song topped the charts in Australia, Bulgaria, Canada, Greece, Hungary, Ireland, Israel, Lithuania, Malaysia, New Zealand, and the United Kingdom, giving Grande her seventh number one in the UK. It also peaked in the top 10 of the charts in 30 other countries. "Positions" has also received sales certifications globally.

Release
On October 14, 2020, Grande took to Twitter to announce that her upcoming album was set to be released that same month. On October 17, she posted a slow-motion teaser video of her typing out the word "positions" on a keyboard. The teaser was followed-up by a countdown launched on her website. She posted the cover art and revealed the release date of the song on October 23. Later that day, she posted a snippet of the song to her social media. "Positions" was released for digital download and streaming on October 23, and was serviced to contemporary hit radio stations in the United States four days later.

Composition
"Positions" is a midtempo pop–R&B song with elements of trap. Lyrically, the song is about Grande describing her dedication to her lover and her willingness to try new things for him. Annie Zaleski of The A.V. Club wrote that the song is "a tune about settling down while preserving your sense of self". Other lyrics, such as the chorus, in which she sings, "Switchin' the positions for you/Cookin' in the kitchen and I’m in the bedroom" include sexual innuendos. Rolling Stones Brittany Spanos referred to the track as a "straightforward plea to get down and dirty any time, any place". It has been speculated that the song was written about Grande's husband, Dalton Gomez. Others suspected that one of the song's lyrics ("I'm just hopin' I don't repeat history") was a veiled reference to her ex-boyfriend Pete Davidson, due to a pause in between the syllables in "repeat". The song's instrumentation features pizzicato guitar plucking, violin, trap drums, and the sound of crickets chirping. It was described by Dani Blum of Pitchfork as a "slinky sex jam" which "drape[d] [Ariana's] harmonies over hazy synths". The Observers Kate Hutchinson compared the song's composition to that of Craig David's 2000 single "7 Days".

Critical reception

In a review for The Guardian, Alexis Petridis described "Positions" as "low-key, if hooky and melodically strong pop-R&B". Hannah Mylrea of NME wrote that the song is a "bold introduction to [Grande's] next musical era" despite not being a "balls-to-the-wall pop belter", and described its sound as "breezy" and "mellow", bolstered by strings and early "Justin Timberlake–style" acoustic guitar. 

Writing for Vulture, Craig Jenkins labeled the song "delightfully simple" and as "sparse" as Grande's previous songs "Best Mistake" (2014) and "Knew Better" (2016), and found it reminiscent of Justin Bieber's 2020 album, Changes, and Mariah Carey's work in the late 1990s. Jenkins added that "Positions" "swings like rap music but it’s also light, breezy, and short", which he identified as a cause for its success on the charts. Bobby Olivier of Spin called the song a "radio-friendly earworm". Idolators Mike Wass dubbed the song as the singer's best lead single to date, with an "instantly catchy" chorus. Wass stated that the "slick", "streaming-friendly", R&B-pop tune "worms its way into your consciousness and simply refuses to leave".

Insider writer, Callie Ahlgrim, stated that song is "unassuming" and the "effervescent energy is even more effective within the context of" the rest of the album's tracklist. Another writer, Courteney Larocca, went on to say that the song "made complete sense as the lead single" and that "it doesn't wear itself out or become grating over time". According to Joan Summers of Jezebel, the song sounded "familiar", writing, "Sonically, she has also journeyed back down an excessively well-trodden path...It’s fine! I don’t mind any of it. Really, though, I swear I have heard this song before. Haven’t I heard this song before?" "Positions" was named the "weakest" song on Positions by Mary Siroky of Consequence of Sound, who referred to it as a "perfectly adequate mid-tempo offering that doesn't rise above the stacked pack". Sputnikmusic called the song's beat "unrecognizable" among the rest of the songs on the album.

Year-end lists
Billboard staff described "Positions" as a "slinky R&B jam" and ranked it as the 21st best song of 2020 stating, "In "Positions", Grande confidently sings about wanting to go “from the kitchen to the bedroom,” owning that women are in fact multidimensional, they further stated "Positions" will forever be remembered for making a statement and providing some levity during a heated moment—one of many in 2020."

Accolades

Commercial performance

North America 

"Positions" debuted at number-one on the Billboard Hot 100, for the week ending November 7, 2020, becoming Grande's fifth number one single in the United States, and third consecutive number one debut in the nation. The song debuted at the top slot on the Streaming Songs chart with 35.3 million U.S. streams and debuted at number two on the Digital Songs chart with 34,000 digital downloads sold in its first week. With the debut of "Positions", Grande further extended her record for the most number one debuts in history with five, while also becoming the first artist to have their first five number one singles all debut at the top. Grande also became the first artist to have the most singles debut at number one in a single calendar year, with three, following her singles "Stuck with U" with Justin Bieber and "Rain on Me" with Lady Gaga. This also made Grande the first artist since Drake to have three number one singles in a single calendar year, but the first woman to do so since Rihanna and Katy Perry did in 2010. "Positions" was also the tenth song to debut at number one in 2020, aiding 2020 in extending its record as the calendar year with the most songs that debuted at number one. "Positions" debuted at the summit of Billboard's Global 200 and Global Excl. U.S. charts, becoming the first song to simultaneously debut atop both Billboard Global charts. In addition, Grande became the first US-born artist to top the Global Excl. US survey.

"Positions" fell one spot to number two in its second week, with over 25.6 million on-demand streams, allowing it to spend a second week atop the Streaming Songs chart. The track was also the Hot 100's top Airplay gainer of the week, with over 27.5 million audience impressions (up 40% from the previous week). With "34+35" debuting at number eight that same week, Grande was the chart's only artist with multiple songs within the top ten. "Positions" spent a total of 17 weeks within the top 10 of the Billboard Hot 100, tying with "Thank U, Next" as Grande's longest-running top 10 single in the United States.

"Positions" peaked at number one on the Mainstream Top 40 airplay chart in December 2020, becoming Grande's seventh number one single and seventeenth top ten single. It remained at number one for seven consecutive weeks, becoming Grande's longest running number one single on the pop airplay chart, surpassing "7 Rings" which topped the chart for six weeks in 2019. It posted the longest reign for a solo song by a woman in nearly eight years, since Taylor Swift's "I Knew You Were Trouble" which also topped the chart for seven weeks in 2013. After spending seven consecutive weeks at number one, "Positions" was dethroned by Grande's own "34+35", making Grande the first artist to replace herself at number one as the only act credited on both tracks. On April 6, 2021, "Positions" was certified Double Platinum by the Recording Industry Association of America (RIAA) for moving 2 million units in the United States.

In Canada, "Positions" entered the Canadian Hot 100 chart at the top position on the issue dated November 7, 2020, becoming Grande's fifth number one single in the country. Additionally, the track debuted at number two on the Canadian Digital Songs Sales chart. Its certified Triple Platinum by the Canadian Recording Industry Association for moving over 240,000 units in Canada.

Europe 
In the United Kingdom, "Positions" debuted at the top of the UK Singles Chart on October 30, 2020, for the week ending date November 5, 2020, becoming Grande's seventh number-one song in Britain. The track garnered over 61,000 digital downloads sold, including 7.6 million streams within its first week of release. With all seven of Grande's number-one singles debuting at the top of the UK Singles Chart, Grande's record of the most number-one single debuts by a female artist was extended, surpassing Madonna, Britney Spears, Rihanna and Cheryl Cole, all of whom have five chart-topping debuts. With seven number-one singles each, Grande joined Elton John, George Michael, Jess Glynne, Justin Bieber, Kylie Minogue, McFly, Michael Jackson, Robbie Williams, Sam Smith, Tinie Tempah, U2, and Beyoncé as one of the artists tied for the ninth-most number-ones on the UK Singles Chart.

In its second week on the chart, "Positions" remained at the number one spot. The same week, parent album Positions debuted at number one on the UK Albums Chart making Grande score a "Official Chart Double". This was the second time Grande achieved this feat; her previous album Thank U, Next and its singles "Break Up with Your Girlfriend, I'm Bored" and "7 Rings" respectively achieved this record in 2019. It remained at number one for a third consecutive week, clocking up over 44,000 chart sales, including 5.4 million streams, becoming Grande's third longest running number one single in the country. "Positions" remained at number one on the UK Singles Chart for the fourth consecutive week earning 44,600 chart sales, including 5.6 million streams, tying with "7 Rings" as Grande's second longest running number one single in the country. It also became the longest running number one single by the female artist released in 2020, surpassing "WAP". It remained at number one for a fifth consecutive week, becoming the third longest-running number one single of 2020 and Grande's second longest running number one single in the country, surpassing "7 Rings". After spending six consecutive weeks at the pole position, it earned Grande her longest running number one single in the United Kingdom, tying with "Thank U, Next", while simultaneously becoming the second longest running number one single of 2020, tying with "Head & Heart" and "Rockstar". On April 9, 2021, "Positions" was certified Platinum by the British Phonographic Industry (BPI) for moving 600,000 units in the United Kingdom.

In Ireland, "Positions" debuted atop the Irish Singles Chart, becoming Grande's seventh number one single in the country. It was the most streamed and downloaded song of the week dated October 30, 2020, with the song racking up 760,000 streams in its debut week. With this feat, Grande tied with Lady Gaga and Calvin Harris as the artist with the sixth-most number one singles on the Irish Singles Chart. Furthermore, Grande also surpassed the record for the amount of number one singles since 2010 for a female artist, surpassing Rihanna. It also remained at the top spot for three consecutive weeks.

Oceania 
In Australia, "Positions" debuted at number one on the ARIA Singles Chart dated November 2, 2020, becoming Grande's fourth number one single in the country. "Positions" was also Grande's third top-three entry for 2020 after charting earlier in the year with "Stuck with U" and "Rain on Me". It remained at number one for two consecutive weeks. Its certified Double Platinum by the Australian Recording Industry Association for moving over 140,000 units in Australia.

In New Zealand "Positions" debuted at number one on the New Zealand Singles Chart, becoming Grande's sixth number one single in the country. It was also Grande's second number one single for 2020 after charting earlier in the year with "Stuck with U". Its certified Platinum by the Recording Industry Association of New Zealand for moving over 30,000 units in the New Zealand.

Music video
The accompanying music video for "Positions" was released along with the song on October 23, 2020. The video was directed by Dave Meyers, and depicts Grande as the President of the United States. The concept for the video was conceived by Grande's husband, Dalton Gomez. Many of the video's scenes were filmed at the Richard Nixon Presidential Library and Museum in Yorba Linda, California. The video received over one million views on YouTube within an hour of its release. On October 26, a behind-the-scenes video was posted to Grande's YouTube channel.

Synopsis and reception
The song's music video sees Grande fulfilling various presidential and domestic tasks, including overseeing a Cabinet meeting, signing executive orders in the Oval Office, giving a medal to postal workers (a response to the 2020 United States Postal Service crisis), walking dogs on the South Lawn, and preparing food in a White House kitchen. Throughout the video, she wears a number of outfits reminiscent of former First Lady of the United States, Jacqueline Kennedy Onassis. It features cameos from frequent collaborators Tayla Parx and Victoria Monét, as well as Grande's mother, Joan. Critics noted a connection between the video's theme and the final United States presidential debate of 2020, which took place hours before the release of the video. The following people also made cameos in the video; Darrion Gallegos, Joan Grande, Josh Liu, Misha Lambert, Nija Charles, Paula Ayotte, Taya Shawki, Tayla Parx, Tyler Ford and Victoria Monét

In Billboards staff picks of the 25 best music videos of 2020, the one for "Positions" was placed at number 6, with Christine Werthman commenting that "less than two weeks before Election Day, Grande allowed us to fantasize about a new, incredibly well-dressed regime in the White House in her scene-switching music video", writing that "Grande takes charge and shows strength in every setting". Vogue named the music video one of the most stylish of 2020. Idolator ranked "Positions" music video as the 22nd best music video of 2020, stating that it "somehow walks the line between old-fashioned and forward-thinking."

Credits and personnel
Credits adapted from Tidal and the liner notes of the CD single.

Personnel
 Ariana Grande – vocals, background vocals, vocal production, arranging, engineering
 London on da Track – production
 Tommy Brown – production
 Mr. Franks – production
 James Jarvis – guitar
 Billy Hickey – engineering
 Serban Ghenea – mixing
 Randy Merrill – mastering
 Peter Lee Johnson – violin

Recording and management
 Recorded at Grande's house and Champagne Therapy Studios (Los Angeles, California)
 Mixed at MixStar Studios (Virginia Beach, Virginia)
 Mastered at Sterling Sound (New York, New York)

Notes
 Physical releases of Positions credit Grande, Charles and Barrett for "lyrics and melodies".

Charts

Weekly charts

Monthly charts

Year-end charts

Certifications

Release history

See also 

 List of Billboard Global 200 number ones of 2020
 List of Billboard Hot 100 number ones of 2020
 List of Billboard Hot 100 number-one singles of the 2020s
 List of Billboard Hot 100 top-ten singles in 2020
 List of Billboard Streaming Songs number ones of 2020
 List of Canadian Hot 100 number-one singles of 2020
 List of number-one singles from the 2020s (New Zealand)
 List of number-one singles of 2020 (Australia)
 List of number-one singles of 2020 (Ireland)
 List of number-one songs of 2020 (Malaysia)
 List of number-one songs of 2020 (Singapore)
 List of top 10 singles in 2020 (Australia)
 List of top 10 singles in 2020 (Ireland)
 List of UK Singles Chart number ones of the 2020s
 List of UK top-ten singles in 2020

References

External links
 
 

2020 singles
2020 songs
Ariana Grande songs
Billboard Hot 100 number-one singles
Canadian Hot 100 number-one singles
UK Singles Chart number-one singles
Irish Singles Chart number-one singles
Number-one singles in Australia
Number-one singles in Greece
Number-one singles in Israel
Number-one singles in Malaysia
Number-one singles in New Zealand
Number-one singles in Singapore
Songs written by Ariana Grande
Songs written by London on da Track
Songs written by Nija Charles
Songs written by Tommy Brown (record producer)
Song recordings produced by Tommy Brown (record producer)
Song recordings produced by London on da Track
Music videos directed by Dave Meyers (director)
Republic Records singles
United States presidency in popular culture
Billboard Global 200 number-one singles
Billboard Global Excl. U.S. number-one singles